Virgin Schallplatten GmbH was the German subsidiary of Virgin Records. It was consolidated into EMI Germany and since 2012 is the Virgin Music division of Universal Music Group Germany. Famous artists who recorded for the company include Sandra, Enigma, Deutsch Amerikanische Freundschaft, And One, RZA, and Reamonn.

See also 
 List of record labels
 Virgin Records
 Virgin Records artists

2002 disestablishments in Germany
German record labels
Virgin Records